Gods River Airport  is located adjacent to Gods River, Manitoba, Canada.

Airlines and destinations

References

External links

Certified airports in Manitoba